"Moby Dick" is an instrumental drum solo by English rock band Led Zeppelin, featured on the band's 1969 album Led Zeppelin II. Named after the 1851 novel of the same name by Herman Melville, it was also known by the alternate titles "Pat's Delight" (early 1968–1969 version with completely different guitar riff) and "Over the Top" (with "Out on the Tiles" intro section and original closing reprise) during various points of the band's career. The track often is regarded as one of the greatest drum solos of all time.

Composition and recording
"Moby Dick" emerged after Led Zeppelin guitarist and producer Jimmy Page found drummer John Bonham jamming or improvising in the studio, recorded parts of his solos and pieced it all together. Studio outtakes from the Led Zeppelin II sessions reveal that the drum solo recorded was edited down from a much longer version.

The guitar riff can be traced back to the BBC unused session track "The Girl I Love She Got Long Black Wavy Hair", which was recorded in the summer of 1969. The riff is also similar to that of Bobby Parker's 1961 hit single, "Watch Your Step", although the progression is in a different key and tempo.

Live performances

Bonham's drum solo was often played at Led Zeppelin concerts from the first North American tour in November 1968, being his solo performance showcase on concert tours through 1977. Over this period it went through three different name changes. During their early 1968–1969 tours it was known as "Pat's Delight" (a reference to Bonham's wife), from 1969–1975 it was "Moby Dick" and during Led Zeppelin's 1977 North American Tour it was "Over the Top" as the solo began with the opening riff to "Out on the Tiles" before segueing into a lengthy drum solo (in the same time ending with a "Moby Dick" riff). The last time "Moby Dick" was played by Led Zeppelin was on 17 July 1977 at the Seattle Kingdome and can be found on various audio and video bootleg recordings.

When played live, Bonham's drum solo would last as little as 6 minutes or, more frequently, as long as 30 minutes, while the rest of the band would leave the stage after having played the introduction.

Live versions of "Moby Dick" are included on the live album How the West Was Won (lasting 19:20, performed at L.A. Forum 25 June 1972) and on Led Zeppelin's 1976 concert film, The Song Remains the Same as part of Bonham's fantasy sequence. It was also included on the film's accompanying soundtrack. Both of them were cut to a shorter version. The Led Zeppelin DVD also has a 15-minute-long version that was performed and recorded at the Royal Albert Hall in 1970.

In popular culture
In the 2008 comedy film Step Brothers, when Brennan touches Dale's drum set for the second time, (this is done with his testicles), he shouts "John Bonham's playing Moby Dick for real!" in doing so.

See also
List of cover versions of Led Zeppelin songs
List of Led Zeppelin songs written or inspired by others
Led Zeppelin discography

References

1969 songs
Atlantic Records singles
Led Zeppelin songs
Rock instrumentals
Songs written by Jimmy Page
Songs written by John Paul Jones (musician)
Songs written by John Bonham
Song recordings produced by Jimmy Page
Music television series theme songs
1960s instrumentals

he:Moby Dick